Bétête is a commune in the Creuse department in the Nouvelle-Aquitaine region in central France.

Geography
The Petite Creuse river forms most of the southern and western border of the commune.

Population

Sights
 The church, dating from the twelfth century.
 The ruins of the medieval castle of Bétête.
 Two châteaux, of le Moisse and of Ecosse, both dating from the seventeenth century.
 The twelfth century abbey of Prébenoît, undergoing restoration.

See also
Communes of the Creuse department

References

Communes of Creuse